Athelston Gaston (April 24, 1838 – September 23, 1907) was a Democratic member of the U.S. House of Representatives from Pennsylvania.

Biography
Athelston Gaston was born in Castile, New York.  He moved with his parents to Crawford County, Pennsylvania, in 1854.  He was engaged in agricultural pursuits until 1873, when he became a dealer in and manufacturer of lumber.  He served as mayor of Meadville, Pennsylvania, from 1891 to 1895.

Gaston was elected as a Democrat to the Fifty-sixth Congress.  He was an unsuccessful candidate for reelection in 1900.  He resumed the lumber business.

Gaston was killed while on a hunting trip along Lake Edward in northern Quebec, Canada, in 1907.  There was no ceremony. Interment in Greendale Cemetery in Meadville, Pennsylvania.

Sources

The Political Graveyard

1838 births
1907 deaths
Mayors of places in Pennsylvania
People from Castile, New York
People from Meadville, Pennsylvania
Accidental deaths in Quebec
Democratic Party members of the United States House of Representatives from Pennsylvania
Hunting accident deaths
19th-century American politicians
Burials at Greendale Cemetery